Empress Xiaoming may refer to:

Empress Dowager Zheng (died 865), empress dowager of the Tang dynasty
Empress Wang (Taizu) (942–963), empress of the Song dynasty

See also
Empress Hu (Yuan Xu's wife) ( 6th century), married to Yuan Xu (Emperor Xiaoming of Northern Wei)